Mount Carmel Township is a township located in Northumberland County, Pennsylvania,  United States.  Erected in 1854, it was named after Mount Carmel in Israel and was formed from part of Coal Township.  It contains the boroughs of Mount Carmel, Kulpmont, and Marion Heights within its borders. The population at the 2010 Census was 3,139, an increase over the figure of 2,701 tabulated in  2000.

Geography
 
According to the United States Census Bureau, the township has a total area of 22.0 square miles (57.0 km2), of which 21.8 square miles (56.5 km2) is land and 0.2 square mile (0.5 km2)  (0.82%) is water.

Its villages include: Atlas, Beaverdale, Connorsville, Den Mar Gardens, Diamondtown, Dooleyville, Locust Gap, Merriam, Mount Carmel Estates, Natalie, Oak Ridge Estates, Reliance, Shady Acres, and Strong.

Demographics

As of the census of 2000, there were 2,701 people, 1,086 households, and 729 families residing in the township.  The population density was 47.8/km2 (123.8/mi2).  There were 1,250 housing units at an average density of 22.1/km2 (57.3/mi2).  The racial makeup of the township was 99.56% White, 0.11% Asian, 0.04% Pacific Islander, 0.04% from other races, and 0.26% from two or more races. Hispanic or Latino of any race were 0.11% of the population.

There were 1,086 households, out of which 27.0% had children under the age of 18 living with them, 51.3% were married couples living together, 11.1% had a female householder with no husband present, and 32.8% were non-families. 30.3% of all households were made up of individuals, and 17.6% had someone living alone who was 65 years of age or older.  The average household size was 2.36 and the average family size was 2.93.

In the township the population was spread out, with 20.9% under the age of 18, 5.5% from 18 to 24, 23.4% from 25 to 44, 24.8% from 45 to 64, and 25.4% who were 65 years of age or older.  The median age was 45 years. For every 100 females, there were 88.0 males.  For every 100 females age 18 and over, there were 82.3 males.

The median income for a household in the township was $28,438, and the median income for a family was $35,847. Males had a median income of $31,713 versus $23,047 for females. The per capita income for the township was $15,376.  About 9.4% of families and 10.8% of the population were below the poverty line, including 12.0% of those under age 18 and 13.1% of those age 65 or over.

References

External links
Mount Carmel Township

1854 establishments in Pennsylvania
Townships in Northumberland County, Pennsylvania
Townships in Pennsylvania